Turkmenistan competed at the 2016 Summer Olympics in Rio de Janeiro, Brazil, from 5 to 21 August 2016. This was the nation's sixth consecutive appearance at the Summer Olympics in the post-Soviet era.

The National Olympic Committee of Turkmenistan sent a team of nine athletes, four men and five women, to compete in five different sports at the Games. This was also the youngest delegation in Turkmenistan's Olympic history, with more than half of the team under the age of 25, and many of them were expected to reach their peak in time for the 2020 Summer Olympics in Tokyo.

Eight Turkmen athletes made their debut in Rio de Janeiro, with hammer thrower Amanmurad Hommadov headed to his second Games as the oldest and most experienced competitor (aged 29). Meanwhile, breaststroke swimmer Darya Semyonova established history for the Turkmens as the youngest ever Olympian (aged 14), beating the record previously held by Yelena Rojkova twelve years earlier in Athens. Other notable athletes featured world's top-ranked judoka Gulbadam Babamuratova in the women's 52 kg category, and backstroke swimmer Merdan Ataýew, the tallest of the team (standing at 6 ft 5 in), who was selected to become Turkmenistan's flag bearer in the opening ceremony.

Turkmenistan, however, had to wait five more years for its first medal.

Athletics
  
Turkmenistan has received universality slots from IAAF to send two athletes (one male and one female) to the Olympics.

Track & road events

Field events

Boxing

Turkmenistan has entered one boxer to compete in the men's middleweight division into the Olympic boxing tournament. Arslanbek Achilov had claimed an Olympic spot with a quarterfinal victory at the 2016 AIBA World Qualifying Tournament in Baku, Azerbaijan.

Judo

Turkmenistan has qualified two judokas for each of the following weight classes at the Games. Gulbadam Babamuratova was ranked among the top 14 eligible judokas for women in the IJF World Ranking List of May 30, 2016, while Rushana Nurjavova at women's lightweight (57 kg) earned a continental quota spot from the Asian region as Turkmenistan's top-ranked judoka outside of direct qualifying position.

Swimming

Turkmenistan has received a Universality invitation from FINA to send two swimmers (one male and one female) to the Olympics.

Weightlifting

Turkmenistan has qualified one male and one female weightlifter for the Rio Olympics by virtue of a top seven national finish (for men) and top six (for women), at the 2016 Asian Championships. The team must allocate these places to individual athletes by June 20, 2016.

References

External links 

 

Olympics
Nations at the 2016 Summer Olympics
2016